The Monastery of San Pedro de Villanueva is a Catholic religious complex located in Villanueva de Cangas, in Cangas de Onis, Asturias, Spain.

This Romanesque monastery was previously owned by the order of Benedictines. A church here supposedly was founded by Alfonso I the Catholic, son in law of Pelagius of Asturias. The remaining structures now date from later periods. In the 12th century, the monastery was built adjacent to the church. The buildings underwent substantial rebuilding after the 17th century. In 1835, the monastery was dissolved. In the present century, the monastery has become a national hotel, a parador. The church is still in use.

Paradores
San Pedro de Villanueva
Bien de Interés Cultural landmarks in Asturias